In the field of counterintelligence, a double agent is an employee of a secret intelligence service for one country, whose primary purpose is to spy on a target organization of another country, but who is now spying on their own country's organization for the target organization.

Double agentry may be practised by spies of the target organization who infiltrate the controlling organization or may result from the turning (switching sides) of previously loyal agents of the controlling organization by the target.  The threat of execution is the most common method of turning a captured agent (working for an intelligence service) into a double agent (working for a foreign intelligence service) or a double agent into a re-doubled agent. It is unlike a defector, who is not considered an agent as agents are in place to function for an intelligence service and defectors are not, but some consider that defectors in place are agents until they have defected.

Double agents are often used to transmit disinformation or to identify other agents as part of counter-espionage operations. They are often very trusted by the controlling organization since the target organization will give them true, but useless or even counterproductive, information to pass along.

Double agents

Re-doubled agent
A re-doubled agent is an agent who gets caught as a double agent and is forced to mislead the foreign intelligence service. F.M. Begoum describes the re-doubled agent as "one whose duplicity in doubling for another service has been detected by his original sponsor and who has been persuaded to reverse his affections again".
 Vitaly Yurchenko

Triple agent

A triple agent is a spy who pretends to be a double agent for one side, while they are truthfully a double agent for the other side. Unlike a re-doubled agent, who changes allegiance due to being compromised, a triple agent is usually considered to have been always loyal to their original side. It may also refer to a spy who works for three opposing sides, such that each side thinks the spy works for them alone.

Notable triple agents include:

Abdul Razak Hussein
Ibrahim Ismail
Humam Khalil
Katrina Leung

Events in which double agents played an important role
 Babington plot
 Battle of Lexington
 Battle of Normandy
 Camp Chapman attack
 Cold War
 Duquesne Spy Ring
 Gukurahundi
 Stormontgate
 Vietnam War
 War on Terrorism
 Yom Kippur War

See also

References

Further reading

External links 
 F. M. Begoum: Observations on the Double Agent

Spies by role
Military command staff occupations